Quantum cosmology is the attempt in theoretical physics to develop a quantum theory of the universe. This approach attempts to answer open questions of classical physical cosmology, particularly those related to the first phases of the universe.

Classical cosmology is based on Albert Einstein's general theory of relativity (GTR or simply GR) which describes the evolution of the universe very well, as long as you do not approach the Big Bang.  It is the gravitational singularity and the Planck time where relativity theory fails to provide what must be demanded of a final theory of space and time. Therefore, a theory is needed that integrates relativity theory and quantum theory. Such an approach is attempted for instance with loop quantum cosmology, loop quantum gravity, string theory and causal set theory.

In quantum cosmology, the universe is treated as a wave function instead of classical spacetime.

See also 
 String cosmology
 Brane cosmology
 Loop quantum cosmology
 Top-down cosmology
 Non-standard cosmology
 Loop quantum gravity
 Canonical quantum gravity
 Dark energy
 Minisuperspace
 Hamilton–Jacobi–Einstein equation
 Theory of everything

References

Notes

External links
 A Layman's Explanation of Quantum Cosmology
 Lectures on Quantum Cosmology by J.J. Halliwell

Quantum gravity
Physical cosmology